N.Velidhoo (Dhivehi: ވެލިދޫ) is one of the inhabited islands of Noonu Atoll in the Maldives. Information from Maldives bureau of statistics

History

When it comes to the History of Velidhoo it is little to no information, Because of the poor understanding of the history behind the island. However it has being said that the first colonisers of this island were indians in the 5th century.This Island has little to no historic landmarks, but there is one. It brings the island together, It's a tree called ( Bodu Nikagas). The tree is Over 300 years old and the oldest and the tallest tree in the island. This tree is located besides the island preschool ( HINZ Preschool ) and in the islands Volleyball court.

Geography
Unknown

Demography
 The Islands Population has started to skyrocket slowly

Governance

Island chiefs 
Below is a list of people who have filled the post of island chief (dates are provided where known).

 Katheebu Kaleyge – Muththoshige Gasim Fulhu (late) – Muththosige
Ibrahim Moosa Kaleyfaanu (Naibu dhonkokko) (late) – Seesange
 Hassan Kaleyfaanu (late) – Muththosige
 Easa Gasim (late) – Daylight
 Mohamed Gasim (late) – Ochidmaage
 Abdul Samed Adam Kaleyfanu – Lubomage (3 September 1977 – 7 April 1982)
 Mohamed Hassan (Magoodhu Mohamed Fulhu)(late) – Dorensyvila (31 March 1970)
 Mohamed Hassan (late)– Muththoshige (3 June 1964 – 9 July 1977)
 Mohamed Abubakur (late) – Hilihilage (19 June 1982 – 31 July 1989)
 Ahmed Waheed (late) (Tholhendhu Waheed) (29 August 1970 – 14 June 1975)
 Abdul Azeez Moosa Kaleyfaanu – Oasanvilla (late)(6 July 1978 – 19 July 1979)
 Ali Moosa Kaleyfanu (late) – Elpaso (6 September 1976 – 16 May 1978)
 Ahmed Wasif (late) – Rediyamge (2 November 1982 – 1 December 1983)
 Moosa Hassanfulhu – Dheyliyaage (17 November 1965 – 1992)
 Abdul Rahman Hussain – Kethi (Retired) 
 Ibrahim Haleem Ali (late) –  Bina (late)(March 10, 2021 past away)
 Ibrahim Naeem - Waves

First Elected Velidhoo Council - 26 February 2011 
 Mohamed Adil - Iramaage (President)
 Ahmed Saeed -  Asdhoo (Vice President)
 Ahmed Ziyaad - Maadhuni
 Ahmed Siraaj - France 
 Mohamed Faiz - Athiriaage

Second Elected Velidhoo Council - 13 March 2013 
 President of council: Ali Ahmeen Boashimaage
 Vice President: Ibrahim Ali Boashimaage
 Councilor: Ali Mujthaba - Kethi
 Councilor: Asma Hussain - Aahama
 Councilor: Ibrahim Qasim - Fashuvimaage

Third Elected Velidhoo Council - 3 June 2017 
 Asma Hussain - Aahama (President)
 Ahmed Jaufaru - Dearhouse ( Vice President)
 Adam Ali - Hasthee (Council Member)

Fourth Elected Velidhoo Council - 17 May 2021 

 Athif Hussain - Aahama (President)
 Jeehan Mohamed - Aliha (Vice President) 
 Haafiza Ibrahim - Azum 
 Mohamed Ali - Boashimaage
 Abdulla Faig - Maahaa

Women's Development Committee - 17 May 2021 

 Shareefa Hassan - Janbuge
 Khadheeja Adam - Hive
 Aiminath Suneela - Adha
 Khadheeja Ibrahim - Bahaaruge
 Dhiyana Abdul Razzaq - Uraha

List of people who have been judges 
 1-Ibrahim Moosa Kaleyfaanu (Naibu dhonkokko) (late) – Seesange
 2-Abdul Azeez Moosa Kaleyfaanu
 3-Ibrahim Haleem
 4-Mohamed Ibrahimfulhu (Miladhoo Mohamed fulhu)
 5-Mohamed Haleem 
 6-raking

Transport
The new harbour was opened by President Abdulla Yameen in 2017.

Transportation
There are several Passenger and Cargo, Boats/Speed Boats operating between velidhoo and the capital Male'; it takes about nine hours on the sea in order to reach the destination. However it only takes about 3 hours from Velidhoo to Male' by Speed Boats. Also there is the option of Air Transport, from Maafaru International Airport.

Boats
Concord Express (Noonu Velidhoo)
Sosan Express (Shaviyani Funadhoo)
Nasru Boat (Haa Dhaal)
Royal 10 (Noonu Holhudhoo)
Dhuraalaa 9 (Noonu Holhudhoo)

Speed Boats and Ferry Services
Hope Travels
Anax Express
Flying Fish 17

Education 
Noonu Atoll Education Centre is a government school in the island.
HINZ pre-school is private school for Baby age between 2yrs and 4 years.

Health 
Velidhoo Health Centre, and the STO Pharmacy.

Culture
The culture is demonstrated in the island

Language
Dhivehi is the language spoken in Velidhoo. Spoken only in Maldives, Dhivehi belongs to the Indo-Aryan branch of the Indo-European family of languages. It has numerous loanwords from Tamil, Malayalam, Sinhalese, Arabic, Urdu, Hindi, Portuguese and English.

Religion
Islam is the official religion of the Republic of Maldives.

Non-profit Organizations and Sports Teams

Like all other communities, Velidhoo also has Ngo's that works for the betterment of Velidhoo. Currently there are only 5 Ngo's actively working in Velidhoo.

NGO
KNG
Kelarians
TKF
Stillred
Baokalo

Sports Teams
Velidhoo Sports Club
Velidhoo Sports Academy

References

Islands of the Maldives